Craigmount High School is a non-denominational secondary school in Edinburgh, Scotland with 1,269 pupils located in the west of Edinburgh, Scotland. It is situated between Corstorphine, East Craigs and Drumbrae and it moved into new premises at the beginning of the 2003 academic year. In April 2016, the new building was closed down by Edinburgh Council due to safety concerns; measures were put in place to continue classes in other premises. The new building reopened as of August 2016 when the building met the minimum safety standards.

History

The first school premises were built in 1970 on the site of a farm to provide accommodation for increasing numbers of pupils from new housing developments.

When the Scotland Japanese School (スコットランド日本語補習授業校 Sukottorando Nihongo Hoshū Jugyō Kō), a weekend Japanese school, opened in 1982, classes were originally held at Craigmount High School. The school classes were moved to Livingston in April 2003.

Craigmount has a long tradition of fielding strong debating teams including winning the Donald Dewar Debating Tournament several times in the early 2010s.  In 2020 Craigmount pupil Freddy Simonet-Lefevre was part of the Scotland team in the World Debating Championships.

Craigmount’s team were finalists in the 2020 Future Asset Competition

New building

By the late-1990s the school was catering for more pupils than it was designed for, and the low-quality fabric of the building was deteriorating. In 2003, work began on the new building under a PPP (Public-Private Partnership) scheme which involved selling the existing building and the upper sports pitches to a property developer. The new building was built on the site of the old playing fields. Work was completed on schedule, and staff and pupils moved into the school in August 2003.

In April 2016 the school building was closed by Edinburgh City Council as building work carried out under a Public-Private Partnership had been classed as unsafe. School classes were subsequently moved to several other premises across Edinburgh. Seventeen other schools in the Edinburgh area were similarly affected. Classes eventually resumed in the building at the start of the 2016/2017 academic year.

Headteachers
 Colin Meikle (2020-current)
 Tony O 'Doherty [Acting] (2020)
 Tom Rae - (2015–2020)
 John J. Campbell - (2006–2014)
 John Fraser - (1999-2005)
 Andrew Bruce - (1993–1999)
 William Trotter - (1970–1993)

Notable alumni

 David Addison-Smith – cricketer
 Tasmina Ahmed-Sheikh - politician
 Tam Dean Burn - Scottish actor
 Craig Chalmers - - Singer and stage performer who appeared on BBC TV's Any Dream Will Do and subsequently starred in Bill Kenwright's production of Joseph and the Amazing Technicolor Dreamcoat
 Michael Stewart - professional footballer, played for Manchester United, Hearts, Hibernian and Charlton Athletic
 Gordon Marshall - professional footballer, played for Falkirk, Celtic, Kilmarnock and Motherwell
 Scott Marshall - professional footballer, played for Arsenal, Southampton and Brentford
Peter Murrell - CEO of the SNP
Callum Innes - contemporary artist 
 Louise Welsh - writer, novels include The Cutting Room and The Bullet Trick.
 We Were Promised Jetpacks - indie band
 Brad McKay - professional footballer, currently playing for Falkirk.
 Keith Shannon, Ambassador to Latvia since 2017

References

External links
 Official website
 Craigmount Environmental Group (Greenmount)
 School page on Scottish Schools Online
 

Secondary schools in Edinburgh
Educational institutions established in 1970
1970 establishments in Scotland